The Mikronegeriaceae are a family of rust fungi in the order Pucciniales. The family contains 4 genera and 13 species.

References

External links

Pucciniales
Basidiomycota families